Amiriyeh (also Romanized as Amīrīyeh) is a village in Posht Rud Rural District, in the Central District of Narmashir County, Kerman Province, Iran. At the 2006 census, its population was 34, in 7 families.

References 

Populated places in Narmashir County